Richard John Fitzpatrick (born 6 September 1970) is an Australian Emmy award winning cinematographer and adjunct research fellow specialising in marine biology at James Cook University.

Early life 
Richard Fitzpatrick's fascination for sharks started at an early age. Richard caught his first Epaulette shark from the Coral Sea and took it home to keep in his aquarium when he was eleven years old. He then took the entire aquarium into school for show and tell.

Career

Fitzpatrick has filmed for clients such as the BBC, National Geographic and Discovery Channel and has been both the skill behind the camera as well as the subject of numerous underwater documentaries.  Known for his unique pioneering techniques for catching sharks by the tail, one of Fitzpatrick's inventions - the shark claw - was  profiled on the ABC's show New Inventors.

In 2014, Fitzpatrick was accredited by the Australian Cinematographers Society and also instigated the world's first underwater Google+ hangout.

Filmography

Awards and nominations

Australian Cinematographers Society
 2017 ACS Golden Tripod Award for Great Barrier Reef Series with David Attenborough
2014 ACS Accreditation
 2007 Distinction Award for Cinematography 'Reef of Riches' Discovery Channel/NHNZ/NHK
 2005 Distinction Award for 'Micro Oceans'

Australian Cinematographers Society QLD
 2016 Gold Award - Wildlife and Nature - Great Barrier Reef Series with David Attenborough
 2012 Gold Award - Wildlife and Nature - Great Barrier Reef Series Episode 1
 2012 Silver Award - Wildlife and Nature - Great Barrier Reef Series Episode 3
 2006 Gold Award – Natural History for 'Equator' Discovery Channel/NHNZ/NHK
 2005 Silver Award – Natural History for 'Killer Jellyfish' Discovery Channel
 2004 Gold Award for 'Micro Oceans'
 2003 Silver Award for 'Raine Island - Nature's Warzone
 2002 Gold Award – Natural History
 2001 Highly Commended – Natural History

Academy of Television Arts and Sciences
 2011 Emmy Award, Cinematography for 'Great Migrations'
 2007 Emmy nomination, Cinematography for 'Reef of Riches'

International Wildlife Film Festival
 2008 Merit Award – Macro Cinematography for Animal behaviour 'Equator – Reef of Riches' Discovery Channel
 2006 Best Photography - 'Equator'
 2000 Merit Award for Visual Effects - Best Underwater Photography – 'Ocean Empires'

International Wildlife Film Festival (Montana)
 2003 Honorable Mention 'Mystery of the Minkes' - Underwater Photography

Tropical NQ Media Awards
 2003 Best Documentary 'Shark Tracker'

Festival International du Film
 2003 Grand Prix du Public - Aventure & Decouverte for 'Shark Tracker', + Special Jury Prize

Festival Mondial de l'Images Sous-Marine, Antibes
 2002 First prize – Grand Format Films for 'Shark Battlefields' (BBC)

Antibes Underwater Film Festival
 2000 Bronze Award - Grand Format Films ' Ocean Empires'

Books 

 2016 Shark Tracker: Confessions of an Underwater Cameraman

Publications 
 Little M, Fitzpatrick R, Seymour J (2016) Successful use of heat as first aid for tropical jellyfish stings. Toxicon 122 (2016) 142-144
 Hammerschlag N, Bell I, Fitzpatrick R, Gallagher AJ, Hawkes LA, Meekan MG, Stevens JD, Thums  M, Witt MJ, Barnett A (2016) Behavioural evidence suggests facultative scavenging by a marine apex predator during a food pulse. Behavioral Ecology and Sociobiology DOI 10.1007/s00265-016-2183-2
 Barnett A, Payne, N, Semmens J, Fitzpatrick R (2016) Ecotourism increases the field metabolic rate of whitetip reef sharks. Biological Conservation. Volume 199, July 2016, Pages 132-136
 Payne N, Snelling E, Fitzpatrick R, Seymour J, Courtney R, Barnett A, Watanabe Y, Sims D, Squire L & Semmens J (2015) A new method for resolving uncertainty of energy requirements in large water breathers: the ‘mega-flume’ seagoing swim-tunnel respirometer. Methods in Ecology and Evolution. Doi:10.11111/20410210S.12358
 Fitzpatrick R, Thums M, Bell I, Meekan MG, Stevens JD, et al. (2012) A Comparison of the Seasonal Movements of Tiger Sharks and Green Turtles Provides Insight into Their Predator-Prey Relationship. PLoS ONE 7(12): e51927. doi:10.1371/journal.pone.0051927
 Lindsay, D.J., Yoshida, H., Uemura, K., Yamamoto, H., Ishibashi, S., Nishikawa, J., Reimer, J.D., Fitzpatrick, R., Fujikura, K. and T. Maruyama. The untethered remotely-operated vehicle PICASSO-1 and its deployment from chartered dive vessels for deep sea surveys off Okinawa, Japan, and Osprey Reef, Coral Sea, Australia. Marine Technology Society Journal 46(4): 20–32.
 Barnett A, Abrantes KG, Seymour J, Fitzpatrick R (2012) Residency and Spatial Use by Reef Sharks of an Isolated Seamount and Its Implications for Conservation. PLoS ONE 7(5): e36574. doi:10.1371/journal.pone.0036574
 Fitzpatrick R, Abrantes K, Seymour J & Barnett A (2011) Variation in depth of whitetip reef sharks: does provisioning ecotourism change their behaviour. Coral Reefs Vol 30:569-577
 Nishikawa J, Fitzpatrick R, Reimer J, Beaman R, Yamamoto H, Lindsay D (2011) In situ observation of Denise's pygmy seahorse Hippocampus denise associated with a gorgonian coral Annella reticulata at Osprey Reef, Australia.  Galaxea 13:25-26
 Heupel MR, Simpfendorfer CA, Fitzpatrick R (2010) Large–Scale Movement and Reef Fidelity of Grey Reef Sharks. PLoS ONE 5(3): e9650. doi:10.1371/ journal.pone.0009650
 Bell I, Seymour J, Fitzpatrick R & Hogarth J (2009) Inter-nesting Dive and Surface Behaviour of Green Turtles, Chelonia mydas, at Raine Island, Northern Great Barrier Reef. Marine Turtles Newsletter 125;5-7 seaturtle.org
 Konow N, Fitzpatrick R & Barnett A. (2006) Adult Emperor angelfish (Pomacanthus imperator) clean giant sunfishes (Mola mola) at Nusa Lembongan, Indonesia. Coral Reefs 
 Fitzpatrick (1994) Reef Understanding – Marine Biology Manual. Great Barrier Reef Marine Park Authority

External links 
 Biopixel website
 
 SixtyMinutes Interview 
 Queensland Q&A 
 Oceans IQ profile

References 

Australian cinematographers
Australian marine biologists
Academic staff of James Cook University
1970 births
Living people
Place of birth missing (living people)